The Legend of the Stardust Brothers (星くず兄弟の伝説, Hoshikuzu kyôdai no densetsu), is a 1985 Japanese musical comedy film written, edited, and directed by Makoto Tezuka. It is based upon original music written by Haruo Chicada.

Plot 

Following their performances, rival musicians, punk rocker Kan (Kan Takagi) of London Boots, and new-wave artist Shingo (Shingo Kubota) of Super Cars, are scouted by Atomic music producer Minami (Kiyohiko Ozaki), who offers a large sum of money to sign them. He states that he can make them both stars within a week, however, they must perform as a duo. Despite not being able to stand each other, they accept the offer, ditching both their bands, as they are transformed into the synth-pop duo, Stardust Brothers. They find themselves quickly rise to stardom, soon having a number one song on the charts, as well as commercial success. Alongside them, Marimo (Kyôko Togawa), their number one fan and president of their fan club, also dreams of becoming an idol but finds difficulty due to the sexist entertainment industry.

At the height of their stardom, the duo starts becoming more reckless and hedonistic, causing concern to the company as they wish to promote artists with cleaner images to the public. When Shingo doesn't turn up to a performance on time, Marimo performs a song in order to entertain the crowd, to their delight. Her song ends up being a big hit with the audience, and she too finds herself rising to stardom, although not contractually tied to the company as she is a woman. 

Minami is later approached and offered a large sum of money to promote another artist, Kaoru (Issay), the son of an influential politician. Soon, Kan and Shingo find themselves losing their fame, and are fired from the company, eventually leading to their downfall. Kaoru sets his sights on Marimo, as he plans to create a scandal between them in order to get the public talking, thus heighten his fame. Kan and Shingo both decide to continue performing, aiming to gain fame without anybody's influence, and Marimo agrees to join them. Kaoru and his goons chase them down, which eventually leads to the death of Minami, shot by Kaoru.

Back to the present day, Kan and Shingo are still performing as the Stardust Brothers, but have fallen far from fame, as they perform to an uninterested crowd.

Cast

Musical numbers 
All songs featured within the film are written and composed by Haruo Chicada.

 "The Stardust Brothers" - Kan Takagi, Shingo Kubota
 "You Don't Like (No) London Boots" - Kan Takagi
 "Around Akasaka" - Shingo Kubota
 "Songs in the Hearts of Young People" - Kiyohiko Ozaki
 "Strong Enemy Atomic" - Kan Takagi, Shingo Kubota
 "Monitor" - Chuji Akagi
 "Ballad of Past Years" - Shingo Kubota
 "Yellow Sun" - Shingo Kubota
 "Marimo's Feelings" - Kyôko Togawa
 "A Man Who Wants To Get Married" - Shingo Kubota
 "Peace Mark Baby" - Issay
 "Gasoline Rain" - Kan Takagi, Shingo Kubota
 "Automatic" - Kan Takagi
 "Crazy Game" - Chuji Akagi
 "Real Star" - Kiyohiko Ozaki

Production 
In 1985, Tezuka met musician and TV personality, Haruo Chicada, who had created a concept album for a non-existent film, inspired by the likes of Phantom of the Paradise and The Rocky Horror Picture Show. Together, with Chicada as producer, they adapted this album to film based upon the already written songs, as well as writing three new tracks based upon characters that Tezuka wrote. Tezuka cast his friends, musicians Shingo Kubota and Kan Takagi, to play the lead roles. 

The film was shot on Super 16mm, and blown up to 35mm for editing. The animated sequence was created by horror manga artist, Yōsuke Takahashi.

Jun Togawa, avant-garde pop singer and sister of Kyôko Togawa, makes a brief cameo as "Beautiful woman of Stardust car".

Release 
Due to the film's poor reception, the film was largely forgotten about, and the original 16mm negative was lost. The film was redistributed by a company, Third Window Films, and was also entered into 30 worldwide film festivals, which helped revitalise the film, as well as gaining an international cult following.

After amassing a cult following in recent years, a sequel to the film called, A Brand New Legend of the Stardust Brothers, was released in 2016 and directed by Makoto Tezuka.

On May 25th, 2021, an North American home release of this film was licensed by kaju film distributor SRS Cinema, which includes special features including the making-of interview and the original trailer. Except for the DVD and streaming, the release was also available in limited quantities on VHS (number of 25) and Blu-ray (number of 1000 copies).

References

External links 
 
 
 

Japanese musical comedy films
1985 films
1980s Japanese films